Kolonie is a part of the village of Brzeście in Poland, located in the Świętokrzyskie Voivodeship, in the Pińczów district. In the years 1975-1998 Colonies administratively belonged to the Kielce Voivodeship.

References 

Villages in Pińczów County
Villages in Poland